Kalmunai is a major city in Ampara District. It is the largest city of Eastern Province, Sri Lanka. It had a total population of 106,780 as of 2011. It is one of the few Muslim-majority municipalities in the country. When Muslims in Colombo were expelled by Portuguese in the 17th century, they fled to Kandy and sought refuge with King Rajasinha II, who resettled these refugees in Kalmunai (8,000 refugees) and Kattankudy (4,000). Kalmunai was the site of the royal farm, as a result of this settlement, it became a Muslim-majority area.

In descending order, the population consists of Sri Lankan Muslims (forming the majority), Sri Lankan Tamils, Sinhalese, and Burghers. It consists of four major regions: Kalmunai city (Thalavatuvan Junction to Tharavai kovil Road), Kalmunai South (Kalmunaikudy) Kalmunai North (Pandiruppu, Maruthamunai, and Neelavanai), Kalmunai Out City (Sainthamaruthu) and Kalmunai West (Natpittimunai, Chenaikudiruppu).

The Sri Lankan civil war devastated the area with many forced disappearances, and civil unrest targeting the local civilians. The city was also severely impacted by the 2004 Tsunami, with many deaths and widespread destruction of property.

The city is bounded on the east by the Indian Ocean on the north by the Periyaneelavanai village and on the south by Karaitivu village, which is considered to be a suburb of the city.

See also
 An Historical Relation of the Island Ceylon

References 

 
Kalmunai Muslim DS Division
Cities in Sri Lanka
Populated places in Ampara District
Kalmunai Tamil DS Division
Sainthamaruthu DS Division